The Mexican Institute of Social Security  (IMSS) is a governmental organization that assists public health, pensions and social security in Mexico operating under the Secretariat of Health. It also forms an integral part of the Mexican healthcare system.

History
The IMSS was founded by Mexican President Manuel Ávila Camacho on January 19, 1943 to satisfy the legal precepts established in the Article 123 of the Mexican Constitution. It is constituted by representations of the workers, employers, and the federal government.

It is the largest social welfare institution in all Latin America.

For some time, however, there have been festering signs of trouble in IMSS, such as serious financial problems that came to a head in early November 2010.

Directors-General

Mexican Social Security Law

The Mexican Social Security law currently in effect, published in the Official Journal of the Federation (21 December 1995), is the legislative domain under which the IMSS carries out its operations.

Currently the law indicates that Social Security has the following purposes:

 Medical assistance
 Protection of basic necessities of subsistence
 Social services necessary for individual and collective well-being
 Giving out a pension which, depending on the completion of the legal prerequisites, will be guaranteed by the State

The law contemplates two domains, an "obligatory" one (funded by individual, employer and state contributions), and a "voluntary" one (aimed at workers in household industries and self-employed professionals).

The following items are excluded from the base quoted salary:
 Tools of trade such as tools and clothing
 Savings deposits, when they are made up of a weekly, biweekly or monthly deposit equally from the worker and the employer
 Additional voluntary contributions
 Contributions to INFONAVIT
 Food and lodging when they are given in an onerous manner
 Payments in coin or cash
 Rewards for attendance and punctuality
 Overtime, within limits established by law

Further reading
Flores Alvarado, A. and J.A. Moran Zenteno. The effects of the health care model of the IMSS-COPLAMAR program on the health status of the underprivileged rural population in Mexico. Mexico: Salud Pública de Mexico. 1989 (Nov-Dec 31(6):745-56.

External links
IMSS website

Government agencies of Mexico
Medical and health organizations based in Mexico
1943 establishments in Mexico
Organizations established in 1943